Söderman is a Swedish surname.

Geographical distribution
As of 2014, 78.3% of all known bearers of the surname Söderman were residents of Sweden (frequency 1:4,500) and 20.0% of Finland (1:9,816).

In Sweden, the frequency of the surname was higher than national average (1:4,500) in the following counties:
 1. Gävleborg County (1:2,000)
 2. Uppsala County (1:2,082)
 3. Stockholm County (1:2,550)
 4. Jämtland County (1:2,672)
 5. Västmanland County (1:3,016)
 6. Västernorrland County (1:3,088)
 7. Värmland County (1:3,963)
 8. Västerbotten County (1:4,481)

In Finland, the frequency of the surname was higher than national average (1:9,816) in the following regions:
 1. Ostrobothnia (1:772)
 2. Åland (1:873)
 3. Southwest Finland (1:4,241)
 4. Satakunta (1:9,280)

People
 August Söderman (1832–1876), Swedish composer
 Karl Söderman (1863–1911), Finnish engineer and businessman
 Harry Söderman (1902–1956), Swedish police officer and criminalist
 Walter Söderman, Swedish ice hockey player
 Tom Söderman (1936–2015), Finnish diplomat and journalist
 Jacob Söderman (born 1938), Finnish politician
 Mikael Söderman, Swedish football manager
 Ulf Söderman (born 1963), Swedish athlete

References

Swedish-language surnames